Blaendare Road Halt railway station served Pontymoile and Cwmynyscoy to the south of Pontypool town centre in Torfaen, South Wales, UK.

History
The station was opened by the Great Western Railway on 30 April 1928 on its line from Pontypool to Newport.  The Halt lay between Pontypool Crane Street to the north and Coedygric Junction to the south. Passenger services were withdrawn and the station closed on 30 April 1962.

The trackbed has been redeveloped into a roadway, and proceeds north-west as a footpath.

References

Disused railway stations in Torfaen
Railway stations in Great Britain opened in 1928
Railway stations in Great Britain closed in 1962
Former Great Western Railway stations
Pontypool